The Germanic god Freyr is referred to by many names in Old Norse poetry and literature. Multiple of these are attested only once in the extant record and are found principally in Skáldskaparmál. Some names have been further proposed by scholars to have referred to the god in the Medieval period, including one from Old English literature.

Names

Proposed names 
Scholars have proposed names that may have been used historically to refer to Freyr. In contrast to the first table, these names rely to varying extents on speculation and are not unequivocal.

See also
List of names of Odin
List of names of Thor
Names of God in Old English poetry

References

Freyr, names of